The Bank of America Open was a golf tournament on the Nationwide Tour from 2002 to 2008. It was played at The Glen Club in Glenview, Illinois, United States. It was known as the LaSalle Bank Open from 2002 to 2007.

The 2008 purse was $750,000, with $135,000 going to the winner.

Winners

External links
PGATOUR.com tournament website

Former Korn Ferry Tour events
Golf in Illinois
Glenview, Illinois
Recurring sporting events established in 2002
Recurring sporting events disestablished in 2008
2002 establishments in Illinois
2008 disestablishments in Illinois